Michèle Beugnet  (born 15 April 1950) is a former French athlete, specialising in the sprints.

Biography  
Nominated 13 times for France athletics teams, she won the silver medal in the 4 × 1 lap relay during the European Indoor Championships 1972 at Grenoble, with Christiane Marlet,  Claudine Meire and Nicole Pani.

Prize list

Records

References  

Living people
1950 births
French female sprinters
Mediterranean Games silver medalists for France
Mediterranean Games bronze medalists for France
Mediterranean Games medalists in athletics
Athletes (track and field) at the 1971 Mediterranean Games